SGV may refer to:
 Segovia, city in Spain.
 SGV (automobile), an early American automobile manufacturer 
 San Gabriel Valley, one of the principal valleys of Southern California, United States 
 Sauerländischer Gebirgsverein, an association for hiking in Germany
 Schifffahrtsgesellschaft des Vierwaldstättersees, an operator of passenger boats on Lake Lucerne, Switzerland
 SyCip Gorres Velayo & Co., a Philippine multidisciplinary professional services firm
 Soil guideline value
 Aerosegovia, Nicaraguan charter airline (ICAO code) 
 Shikand-gumanig Vizar, a Zoroastrian theology book
 Swiss Laboratory Animal Science Association, see Life Sciences Switzerland